Platycerus delagrangei is a species of stag beetle, from the Lucinidae family and Lucaninae subfamily. It was discovered by Léon Fairmaire in 1892.

Geographical distribution 
It can be found in Syria and Turkey.

References 

Lucanidae
Beetles described in 1892